Kaiserin Josephine is an operetta in 8 scenes by Hungarian composer Emmerich Kálmán. It premiered in Zürich, at the municipal theatre, on 18 January 1936.

Roles

References 

Operas by Emmerich Kálmán
Hungarian music
German-language operettas
1936 operas
France in fiction
Cultural depictions of Joséphine de Beauharnais
Cultural depictions of Napoleon